This is a timeline of Mongols prior to the Mongol Empire.

8th century

700s

10th century

900s

920s

950s

960s

990s

11th century

1000s

1050s

1060s

1080s

12th century

1100s

1110s

1140s

1160s

Genghis Khan's ancestors 
Borte Chino (Grey Wolf) and his wife was Gua Maral (White Doe)
1. Bat Tsagan - was the son of Borte Chino and Gua Maral
2. Tamacha - was the son of Bat Tsagan
3. Horichar Mergen - was the son of Tamacha
4. Uujim Buural - was the son of Horichar Mergen
5. Sali Hachau - was the son of Uujim Buural
6. Yehe Nidun - was the son of Sali Hachau
7. Sem Sochi - was the son of Yehe Nidun
8. Harchu - was the son of Sem Sochi
9. Borjigidai Mergen - was the son of Harchu, and his wife was Mongoljin Gua
10. Torogoljin Bayan - was the son of Borjigidai Mergen, and his wife was Borogchin Gua
11. Duva Sokhor - was the first son of Torogoljin Bayan
11. Dobu Mergen|Dobun Mergen - was the second son of Torogoljin Bayan, and his wife was Alan Gua
12. Belgunudei - was the first son of Dobun Mergen and Alan Gua
12. Bugunudei - was the second son of Dobun Mergen and Alan Gua
---
12. Bukhu Khatagi - was the first son of Alan Gua, conceived after the death of Dobun Mergen
12. Bukhatu Salji - was the second son of Alan Gua, conceived after the death of Dobun Mergen
12. Bodonchar Munkhag - was the third son of Alan Gua, conceived after the death of Dobun Mergen
13. Habich Baghatur - was the son of Bodonchar Munkhag
14. Menen Tudun - was the son of Habich Baghatur
15. Hachi Hulug - was the son of Menen Tudun
16. Khaidu - was the son of Hachi Hulug
17. Bashinkhor Dogshin - was the first son of Khaidu
18. Tumbinai Setsen - was the son of Baishinkhor Dogshin
19. Khabul Khan - was the first son of Tumbinai Setsen, and Khan of the Khamag Mongol (1120–1149)
20. Ohinbarhag - was the first son of Khabul Khan
20. Bartan Baghatur - was the second son of Khabul Khan
21. Mengitu Hiyan - was the first son of Bartan Baghatur
21. Negun Taiji - was the second son of Bartan Baghatur
21. Yesugei - was the third son of Bartan Baghatur, and his wife was Hoelun
22. Temujin (Genghis Khan) - was the first son of Yesugei and Hoelun, and Khan of the Khamag Mongol (1189–1206)

References

Bibliography
 .

 (alk. paper) 
 

 

  (paperback).
 

 
 .

 

 
 

 
 

 

 
  
 

 
 

Mongols
History of Mongolia